Turkish Airlines Flight 6491 was a scheduled international cargo flight operated by ACT Airlines on behalf of Turkish Cargo, from Hong Kong to Istanbul via Bishkek, Kyrgyzstan. On 16 January 2017, the Boeing 747-400F flying the route crashed in a residential area while attempting to land in thick fog at Manas International Airport, Bishkek. A total of 39 people – all four crew members on board and 35 residents on the ground – were killed.

The subsequent investigation found that the aircraft failed to properly acquire the instrument landing system's signal, remaining significantly higher than the correct approach path while overflying the entire length of the runway; it then collided with houses seconds after initiating a go-around.

Accident
At 07:19 local time (01:19 UTC) on 16 January 2017, the aircraft crashed nearly  beyond the end of runway 26 at Manas International Airport, in thick fog. According to initial reports, the aircraft failed to gain enough altitude while attempting a go-around. It crashed into terrain and destroyed several houses. Kyrgyz authorities later stated that the crew were making a determined attempt to land the aircraft instead of aborting the landing.

Among the dead were 17 children.

Witnesses and rescuers reported that they found the pilot still conscious strapped into his seat, from which he had to be cut free. He later died while en route to a hospital.

Fourteen people on the ground were injured, including a number of children. Nineteen houses were destroyed at the crash site, and a further seven were damaged. Manas International Airport was closed, with all flights cancelled, following the accident.

Aircraft and crew 

The aircraft involved was a Boeing 747-412F, registered as TC-MCL and with manufacturer's serial number 32897. The plane entered service with Singapore Airlines Cargo in 2003, with the registration 9V-SFL. After multiple periods of storage, the aircraft was acquired by Istanbul-based cargo company ACT Airlines in 2015, which then began operating it on behalf of Turkish Cargo. The aircraft had flown a total of over 45,000 hours and 8,000 cycles as of June 2016. Its last C-check maintenance check had been completed on 6 November 2015.

The crew consisted of Captain Ibrahim Diranci, First Officer Kazim Ondul (both aged 59), loadmaster Ihsan Koca, and cargo handler Melih Aslan.

Immediate response
Deputy Prime Minister Mukhammedkalyi Abulgaziyev reported that, by late morning, more than 1,000 rescue workers were at the scene. Minister of Health Talantbek Batyraliyev reported that by 11:46 a.m. local time, around 56 doctors and psychologists and 14 ambulance crews had been dispatched to the scene.

A number of heads of state expressed condolences, including the presidents of the other members of the Commonwealth of Independent States and the Prime Minister of Turkey.

The following day was declared a day of national mourning in Kyrgyzstan.

Investigation

The cause of the crash was not immediately clear. Kyrgyzstan's Emergency Situations Minister, Kubatbek Boronov, stated that it was foggy at Manas at the time of the crash, but that weather conditions were not critical. By the afternoon of 16 January, one of the two flight recorders had been found, and the other was located later in the recovery process. Both the flight data recorder (FDR) and cockpit voice recorder (CVR) were damaged in the crash, but investigators were still able to retrieve data from both recorders.

Deputy Prime Minister Abulgaziyev suggested that the cause may have been pilot error, noting that eleven aircraft had landed safely, despite the same weather conditions, on the previous day. He added that the aircraft had attempted to land twice and had damaged the runway lights at one stage. This statement was at odds with another official statement that the aircraft crashed during its first landing attempt.

The Interstate Aviation Committee (IAC or MAK) of the Commonwealth of Independent States opened a technical investigation.

The Turkish Transportation Ministry said it had sent two experts from its accident investigation board to Bishkek to assist Kyrgyz authorities.

A Boeing technical team travelled to the accident site to provide assistance at the request and under the direction of the American accident investigation body, the National Transportation Safety Board.

Many initial press responses stated that a Turkish Airlines aircraft was involved in the accident. In response, Turkish Airlines released a statement saying that neither the aircraft nor the crew were part of the airline, calling it an "ACT Airlines accident". Journalists were threatened by Turkish lawyers claiming reputational damage. Nevertheless, the flight was operated under a Turkish Airlines flight number.

The preliminary investigation report found that the aircraft descended late and captured a false glideslope. On capturing the false glide slope, the 3 auto pilots then initiated the descent of the plane in low visibility conditions. Initially all three auto pilots were engaged (LAND 3) the false glideslope was lost 15 seconds after it was acquired and AP CAUTION and FMA FAULT 2 events were recorded meaning that the auto pilots would continue to descend the aircraft on a 3 degree slope using inertial guidance. One autopilot disengaged (LAND 2) and the remaining auto pilots flew down to the decision height. The crew did not acquire the required visual reference at the decision height (99 ft) and initiated a go-around 1/2 second later at 58 ft radar altitude by pressing the TOGA switches. Given the slightly up-sloping terrain after the end of the runway, the aircraft did not have sufficient height at that point to climb out safely.

On 2 February 2020, the IAC released the final report on the accident. The flight crew had failed to keep track of the aircraft's position on the correct glideslope and only initiated a go-around after the aircraft had deviated off course, the pre-flight briefing was insufficient, the crew did not decrease the aircraft's height so it could reach the required approach point on the navigation chart, the air traffic controllers failed to use equipment to monitor the aircraft's position, the flight crew experienced stress, and other factors.

Aftermath 
On 17 January 2017, the Kyrgyz press reported that ACT Airlines had declared the intent to pay the victims compensation for all material and immaterial losses, citing a press release on the ACT Airlines web site. The press release itself, however, stated only that losses were covered by insurance.

Notes

References

External links 

 "Boeing 747-412F TC-MCL 16.01.2017." Interstate Aviation Committee. Content in Russian: "Боинг 747-412F TC-MCL 16.01.2017."
 

2017 in Kyrgyzstan 
2017 disasters in Kyrgyzstan 
Aviation accidents and incidents involving controlled flight into terrain
Aviation accidents and incidents in 2017
Aviation accidents and incidents in Kyrgyzstan
Accidents and incidents involving the Boeing 747
Transport in Bishkek
January 2017 events in Asia
6491
History of Bishkek
Accidents_and_incidents_involving_cargo_aircraft